Toufik Addadi (born 7 October 1990) is an Algerian footballer who plays for ASO Chlef.

Career
In 2019, Toufik Addadi signed a contract with JS Kabylie.

In 2020, Toufik Addadi signed a contract with MC Alger.

In 2021, Toufik Addadi signed a contract with  US Monastir..

References

External links
 

1990 births
Algerian footballers
Living people
Association football midfielders
JS Kabylie players
21st-century Algerian people